Ianni is a surname. Notable people with the surname include:

Octavio Ianni (1926–2004), Brazilian sociologist
Patrick Ianni (born 1985), American soccer player
Stefano Ianni (born 1981), Italian tennis player
Tayt Ianni (born 1971), American soccer player

See also
Larry Di Ianni, Canadian politician